Henry Thomas Helgesen (June 26, 1857 – April 10, 1917) was a U.S. Representative from North Dakota.

Born near Decorah, Iowa, Helgesen attended the public schools, the John Breckenridge Normal Institute, and the J.R. Slack Business College at Decorah. He moved to Milton, Dakota Territory (now North Dakota), in 1887.

He engaged in the mercantile and lumber business and also in agricultural pursuits. He served as the North Dakota commissioner of agriculture and labor from 1889 and 1892; the first to hold the office. He served as member of the board of education of Milton, North Dakota. from 1893 to 1896, and served as president in 1893 and 1894. He served as member of the board of regents of the University of North Dakota 1897-1901 and 1907–1913. He was an unsuccessful candidate for election to the Sixty-first Congress in 1908.

Helgesen was elected as a Republican to the Sixty-second and to the three succeeding Congresses and served from March 4, 1911, until his death in Washington, D.C., April 10, 1917.
He was interred in Phelps Cemetery, Decorah, Iowa.

The most notable action of Helgesen in his Congressional career was that he was a key figure between 1911 and 1916 in Congressional activity in support of the claims of Dr. Frederick Cook with regard to being the first explorer to reach the North Pole, and a corresponding demand to take back the promotion of Robert Peary to the rank of rear admiral.  Research by William R. Hunt into this matter showed that Helgesen's staff in Washington included an aide, Ernest C. Rost, who was a professional photographer and a friend of Dr. Cook.  Later it turned out that Rost was a hired lobbyist for Cook.  Helgesen read into the Congressional Record of 1915 published pamphlets and newspaper articles in support of Cook.  However, a year later Cook went on a trip to Asia, and Helgesen denounced Cook as a fraud.  It cannot be ascertained if there is any connection but Cook was being sued for non-payment of salary owed to Rost at this time.  Further activity by Helgesen ended with his death in April 1917.

See also
List of United States Congress members who died in office (1900–49)

Sources

 Henry T. Helgesen, late a representative from North Dakota, Memorial addresses delivered in the House of Representatives and Senate frontispiece 1919
 William R. Hunt To Stand at the Pole: The Dr. Cook - Admiral Peary North Pole Controversy (New York: Stein & Day, 1981) illus. p. 162, 167–169, 199. 

1857 births
1917 deaths
North Dakota Commissioners of Agriculture and Labor
American people of Norwegian descent
People from Winneshiek County, Iowa
People from Cavalier County, North Dakota
Republican Party members of the United States House of Representatives from North Dakota
19th-century American politicians